Denis Mosalev (born 28 February 1986) is a Russian professional ice hockey player who is currently playing with HC Dinamo Minsk in the Kontinental Hockey League (KHL).

Mosalev previously played with HC Dynamo Moscow of the KHL from the 2010–11 season. After previously playing at the top level with Metallurg Magnitogorsk and HC MVD.

References

External links

1986 births
Living people
People from Chelyabinsk Oblast
HC Dinamo Minsk players
HC Dynamo Moscow players
Lokomotiv Yaroslavl players
HC MVD players
Metallurg Magnitogorsk players
Russian ice hockey forwards
HC Sochi players
Sportspeople from Chelyabinsk Oblast